Torridon (Scottish Gaelic: Toirbheartan) is a small village in the Northwest Highlands of Scotland. However the name is also applied to the area surrounding the village, particularly the Torridon Hills, mountains to the north of Glen Torridon. It lies on the shore of Loch Torridon.

Location 
There is a large hotel, The Torridon, which holds 3 AA Rosettes as well as 5 red stars and is a leading hotel in the UK, a popular public bar (Bo & Muc), and a youth hostel within walking distance. The Torridon area is widely acknowledged as having some of the most dramatic mountain scenery in the whole of the British Isles.

Notable residents
 From 1925 until 1931 John McQueen Johnston served as GP to the area.

Mountains
The loch is surrounded by numerous mountains to the north, including Liathach, Beinn Alligin and Beinn Eighe, all of which are over 3000 feet in height. Specifically, they are:
 Liathach
 Beinn Eighe
 Beinn Alligin

Hills between Glen Torridon and Strath Carron share much of the splendour and character of the main hills, although perhaps less of the drama:
 Beinn Liath Mhòr
 Sgorr Ruadh
 Maol Cheann-dearg
 Beinn Damh
 An Ruadh-stac
 Fuar Tholl

CELTMAN! Extreme Scottish Triathlon 
Torridon hosts the annual CELTMAN! Extreme Scottish Triathlon since June 2011. The 3.4 km swim takes place in Loch Shieldaig while the 202 km bike leg is notable for the strong winds affecting competitors. Finally the 42 km run takes in two Munros during the race over the Beinn Eighe range.

Gallery

See also
Shieldaig
Torridon folk rock band

References

External links 

Torridon.org is the local website, listing accommodation and useful information.
Torridon walks gives comprehensive information on walks and places to stay in the area, including Gaelic pronunciations and OS maps.

 
Populated places in Ross and Cromarty
Geological type localities of Scotland
Populated coastal places in Scotland